The 2009 Brasil Open was a men's tennis tournament played on outdoor clay courts. It was the 9th edition of the Brasil Open, and was part of the ATP World Tour 250 series of the 2009 ATP Tour. It took place in Costa do Sauípe resort, Mata de São João, Brazil, from 9 February through 14 February 2009.

The singles line up was led by world no. 17 and defending champion Nicolás Almagro, Tommy Robredo and Albert Montañés. Other top seeds are 2009 Viña del Mar finalist José Acasuso, Marcel Granollers, Eduardo Schwank, Nicolas Devilder and Potito Starace.

Entrants

Seeds

Rankings as of February 9, 2009.

Other entrants
The following players received wildcards into the main draw:

 Ricardo Hocevar
 Flávio Saretta
 Thiago Alves
 Fred Gil (as a special exempt)
 Pablo Cuevas (as a special exempt)

The following players received entry from the qualifying draw:

 Łukasz Kubot
 Rui Machado
 Daniel Silva
 Caio Zampieri

Champions

Singles

 Tommy Robredo def.  Thomaz Bellucci, 6–3, 3–6, 6–4
It was Robredo's first title of the year and 8th of his career.

Doubles

 Marcel Granollers /  Tommy Robredo def.  Lucas Arnold Ker /  Juan Mónaco 6–4, 7–5

External links
Official website
Singles Draw
Doubles Draw
Qualifying Singles Draw

 
Brasil Open
Brasil Open